Magnitsky is a Russian surname of Orthodox clergy. Notable people with the surname include:

Leonty Magnitsky (1669–1739), Russian mathematician
Sergei Magnitsky (1972–2009), Ukrainian-born Russian auditor

See also
Magnitsky Act
Magnitsky legislation

Surnames of Russian origin